In March 1944, a force of three Imperial Japanese Navy (IJN) heavy cruisers raided Allied shipping in the Indian Ocean, the codename of this operation was Operation SA No.1. The cruisers departed Japanese-held territory on 1 March with the support of other IJN vessels and aircraft. On 9 March, they encountered and sank the British steamer Behar, with the heavy cruiser  picking up over 100 survivors. Fearing detection, the Japanese force subsequently returned to the Netherlands East Indies (NEI), arriving on 16 March. Two days later, most of Behars crew and passengers were murdered on board Tone. Following the war the commander of the raid, Rear Admiral Naomasa Sakonju, was executed for this war crime and Tones captain Haruo Mayuzumi (:ja:黛治夫) was sentenced to seven years imprisonment.

Background
In February 1944, the Japanese Combined Fleet withdrew from its base at Truk in the Central Pacific to Palau and Singapore. The appearance of a powerful Japanese naval force at Singapore concerned the Allies, as it was feared that these ships could potentially conduct raids in the Indian Ocean and against Western Australia. In response, the Allies strengthened their naval and air forces in the area by transferring two British light cruisers from the Atlantic and Mediterranean as well as several U.S. Navy warships from the Pacific. The number of air units in Ceylon and the Bay of Bengal region was also increased. Admiral James Somerville, the commander of the British Eastern Fleet, feared that the Japanese would repeat their devastating Indian Ocean raid of early 1942, and on 25 February requested permission to withdraw his fleet from its base at Trincomalee so that it was not at risk from the larger Japanese force. The Admiralty rejected this request, and directed that the fleet should remain at Trincomalee unless it was threatened by a superior Japanese force as its withdrawal would affect morale and harm Britain's prestige in the region. It was agreed, however, that the Eastern Fleet should not engage superior Japanese forces and could withdraw if Somerville judged this necessary.

This force was commanded by Rear Admiral Naomasa Sakonju on board Aoba. In his instructions to Sakonju, Vice Admiral Takasu directed that if the force captured Allied merchant seamen all prisoners, other than radio operators and other personnel who might possess useful information, were to be killed. Sakonju did not question this order. The Japanese cruisers embarked specialised boarding parties for this operation as it was hoped that they could capture merchant ships to alleviate Japan's shipping shortage.

Raid
The three Japanese heavy cruisers departed from the Combined Fleet's anchorage in the Lingga Islands on 27 February. The raiders were supported by 10 medium bombers and three or four seaplanes based in Sumatra and west Java which conducted patrols in the direction of Ceylon. Three or four submarines from the 8th Flotilla also monitored Allied shipping movements near Ceylon, the Maldive Islands and Chagos Archipelago. The Allies did not detect the Japanese force's departure, but reinforced their forces in Western Australia after an American submarine encountered Kinu and Ōi operating near the Lombok Strait on 6 March. The presence of these ships was taken to indicate that a hostile force had possibly been dispatched into the Indian Ocean. On 8 March, Somerville directed all Allied ships travelling between 80 and 100° east to divert to the south or west.

After leaving the Sunda Strait, the Japanese heavy cruisers sailed south-west for the main route between Aden and Fremantle. The ship was travelling from Fremantle to Bombay as part of a voyage between Newcastle, New South Wales and the United Kingdom carrying a cargo of zinc.

Upon sighting the Japanese ships, Behars master, Captain Maurice Symons, ordered that his radio operator transmit the "RRR" code in order to notify other ships and Allied bases that the merchant ship was being attacked by surface raiders. Tones signals room picked up this message,. The Tone first signaled repeatedly to the Behar to surrender, but as the Behar continued to flee, the cruiser opened fire on the Behar. The Japanese cruiser did not attempt to capture the steamer, as it was judged too risky to sail her back to Japanese territory. Tones gunners scored hits on Behars prow and stern which killed three of her crew. Five minutes after the sighting, Behars crew and passengers abandoned ship. The steamer sank shortly afterwards and either 104 or 108 survivors were rescued by Tone.

The Behar survivors were maltreated by members of Tones crew. Japanese sailors forced the survivors to hand over all their personal belongings of any value, and then used ropes to tie the survivors in painful positions which caused them to have difficulty breathing. The merchant ship's chief officer was beaten after he complained that treating civilians in such a way violated the Geneva Convention. However, the female survivors later had their ropes removed. When the survivors were taken below decks to be imprisoned they were badly beaten by Japanese sailors.

Following the attack, Sakonju judged that it was too dangerous to continue the raid as Behars distress message may have alerted the Allies to his force's presence. Accordingly, the Japanese turned back for the NEI that day. The heavy cruisers were again escorted through the Sunda Strait by Kinu, Ōi and five destroyers, and arrived back at the NEI on 15 March. During this time, the Behar survivors were held in a small and extremely hot store room on board Tone, and were given little access to food and water, sanitary facilities and exercise.

Despite Sakonju's fears, the Allies were not immediately aware of the attack on Behar. Her distress signal had been picked up by only a single Allied merchant ship, which did not report it until she arrived at Fremantle on 17 March. In the meantime, Somerville had decided on 16 March that surface raiders no longer posed a threat to shipping in the Indian Ocean and allowed Allied vessels to resume their normal routing.

Massacre
Shortly after the Behar survivors were rescued, Sakonju sent a radio message to Tones commanding officer, Captain Haruo Mayuzumi, reprimanding him for taking non-essential personnel prisoner and not capturing the merchant ship. In this message Sakonju ordered that the survivors be killed. Mayuzumi was unwilling to do so, however, as he felt that this would violate his Christian religious beliefs. His executive officer, Commander Junsuke Mii, also opposed killing the prisoners. Mayuzumi radioed a request to Sakonju that the prisoners be put ashore, but this was rejected. The captain then visited Aoba to argue his case, but Sakonju remained unmoved and told Mayuzumi to "obey my orders". Despite his misgivings, Mayuzumi decided to kill the prisoners.

On 15 March the three heavy cruisers anchored at Tanjung Priok near Java. Following this, either 15 or 36 survivors were transferred to Aoba. The party sent to Aoba included Symonds, the Behars chief officer and several of the senior officers as well as both of the ship's female passengers. All of this group were later landed at Tanjung Priok.

The three cruisers sailed from Tanjung Priok bound for Singapore on 18 March. That night, all the prisoners on board Tone were beheaded by several of the cruiser's officers. Mayuzumi watched the killings from the ship's bridge but Mii refused to take part. The number of the crew to be executed was between 65 to at least 100.

Aftermath

Aoba, Chikuma and Tone arrived at Singapore on 25 March. The Indian Ocean raid was the last operation conducted by Axis surface raiders during World War II. As a result, Behar was the final Allied merchant ship to be sunk by surface raiders during the war.
The raid is notable chiefly for the Behar massacre; it achieved little militarily. The raid failed to disrupt Allied traffic in the region as the diversions ordered by Somerville on 8 March were rescinded by the 16th. The only tangible result was the sinking of one ship,  the Behar; by contrast Axis submarines sank three ships in the Indian Ocean during the same period. The raid was also less successful than comparable raids by surface ships in the region, such as that of the Admiral Scheer in 1941. The Japanese made no attempt to capitalize on their numerical superiority in the region and by the end of the month it had vanished; reinforcements to the Eastern Fleet enabled Somerville to start  a series of carrier raids, commencing with an attack on Sabang on 19 April 1944.

The party of Behar survivors who had been landed at Tanjung Priok were initially interned in prisoner of war camps in Java; the male prisoners were sent to a camp near Batavia and the women were held in a female camp nearby. After all the members of the group had been interrogated, the survivors were separated and sent to other camps in Java or to work as slave labourers in Japan. All the survivors were freed after the end of the war in August 1945. One of the Survivors Mrs Agnes (Nancy) Shaw had been travelling to India to join her husband. They had been separated when they escaped from Malaya on different ships. She was imprisoned at Camp Makkasar in Batavia (now Java) where she worked in the camp bakery. She was reunited with her husband after Java was liberated. When the British Government negotiated gratuities for Far East Prisoners of War the Foreign and Commonwealth Office disavowed knowledge of her captivity. However, on being shown artefacts from captivity including a pastel sketchbook the gratuity was paid.  She died in Aberdeen in February 2002 aged 89.

Following the war, the Allies prosecuted the officers responsible for the murders on board Tone. Vice Admiral Takasu had died from disease in September 1944, but Sakonju was tried by the British in 1947 at Hong Kong and sentenced to death and executed 21 January 1948. Mayuzumi was also convicted for his role in the killings and sentenced to seven years imprisonment. Sakonju stated in his affidavit that he was 'retaliating against the execution and inhuman treatment of Japanese prisoners by the allies in Guadalcanal', and also stated in his defense that the Tone executed the prisoners after the operation has ended and the Tone left his command. Mayuzumi stated in his defense that he was following Sakonju's orders. Mayuzumi received a light sentence due to his repeated requests for clemency for the prisoner's lives.

See also
 Japanese raiders in the Indian Ocean

Notes
  The number of Behar survivors rescued after the ship's sinking differ between sources. Lamont-Brown (2002), p. 111 states that 108 of the 111 people on board the ship were rescued while Gill (1968), p. 389 states that there were 104 survivors, all of whom were rescued.
  Gill (1968), p. 389 states that 15 Behar survivors were landed at Tanjung Priok while Lamont-Brown (2002), p. 112 puts the figure at 36.

Citations

References

 
 
 
 
 
 
 

Conflicts in 1944
Indian Ocean operations of World War II
Naval battles of World War II involving Japan
Japanese war crimes
Naval battles and operations of World War II involving the United Kingdom
March 1944 events
Military raids
Japan–United Kingdom military relations